Centennial Place is a building complex located in downtown Calgary, Alberta, Canada, which includes a 39-storey  and 23-storey  office tower.

The complex was named to honour Alberta's Centennial year. The complex includes an underground five-level parkade with 793 stalls. Construction of Centennial Place started in 2006 and was completed in 2010 at a cost of $320-million ($ million in ). The property's sustainability features include curtain wall technology, motion sensors on lighting controls, low-flow plumbing fixtures, a high-efficiency heating and cooling plant, and a green roof with 30% of its surface planted. In 2010, the complex was certified LEED Gold for Core and Shell Development and LEED Platinum for Existing Buildings: Operations and Maintenance. The buildings are owned and operated Oxford Properties.

As of 2020, Centennial Place I is listed by the Council on Tall Buildings and Urban Habitat as the 8th tallest building in Calgary, and 52nd tallest in Canada.

Centennial Place's tenants include Vermilion Energy, Borden Ladner Gervais, MLT Aikins, Divestco, Baytex Energy, AER, Murphy Oil, the Alberta Securities Commission, Sabre Well Servicing Inc., Spencer Stuart and OMERS Worldwide.

See also
List of tallest buildings in Calgary

References

External links

Centennial Place

Buildings and structures in Calgary
Skyscrapers in Calgary
Office buildings completed in 2010
Oxford Properties
Skyscraper office buildings in Canada
WZMH Architects buildings